Plateumaris braccata is a species of leaf beetle from the Donaciinae family which can be found in the western part of the Palearctic region, from Spain to Central Asia.

References

Donaciinae
Beetles described in 1772
Taxa named by Giovanni Antonio Scopoli